Papar railway station is one of four main railway station on the Western Sabah Railway Line located in Papar, Sabah, Malaysia.

History 
As part of the development of rail networks in North Borneo, construction of rail networks has started since 1896 with Papar have become one of economic production site in the West Coast Division as sago mills began to appear in the area as well in Beaufort. Full operation service of the North Borneo Railway was launched on 1 August 1914. During World War II, a railway bridge crossing the Papar River was destroyed while the railway station was ridden with bullets following the heavy fighting between the Australian and Japanese forces.

In 2007, the station was closed for renovation works with the station building which was originally built from wood being demolished and replaced with a new concrete building. The present station began its operation on 21 February 2011. In 2016, new diesel multiple unit (DMUs) from Japan for use in the Tanjung Aru–Beaufort lines was introduced. A tourist stop centre is set to be built near the station in 2017.

References

External links 
 

Railway stations opened in 1914
Railway stations in Sabah